The Other Side of Bonnie and Clyde is a 1968 docudrama film directed and produced by Larry Buchanan.

References

External links

The Other Side of Bonnie and Clyde at TCMDB

1968 films
Bonnie and Clyde
1968 crime drama films
Films directed by Larry Buchanan
1960s English-language films